Neil Immerman (born 24 November 1953, Manhasset, New York) is an American theoretical computer scientist, a professor of computer science at the University of Massachusetts Amherst. He is one of the key developers of descriptive complexity, an approach he is currently applying to research in model checking, database theory, and computational complexity theory.

Professor Immerman is an editor of the SIAM Journal on Computing and of Logical Methods in Computer Science. He received B.S. and M.S. degrees from Yale University in 1974 and his Ph.D. from Cornell University in 1980 under the supervision of Juris Hartmanis, a Turing Award winner at Cornell. His book Descriptive Complexity appeared in 1999.

Immerman is the winner, jointly with Róbert Szelepcsényi, of the 1995 Gödel Prize in theoretical computer science for proof of what is known as  the Immerman–Szelepcsényi theorem, the result that nondeterministic space complexity classes are closed under complementation. Immerman is an ACM Fellow and a Guggenheim Fellow.

References

External links
Immerman's home page at U. Mass. Amherst

American computer scientists
Cornell University alumni
Fellows of the Association for Computing Machinery
Gödel Prize laureates
University of Massachusetts Amherst faculty
Living people
Theoretical computer scientists
People from Manhasset, New York
Scientists from New York (state)
1953 births